Phai Lom is a subdistrict (tambon) in the Bang Krathum District of Phitsanulok Province, Thailand.

Geography
Phai Lom borders Nakhon Pa Mak to the north, Noen Kum to the east, Phichit Province to the south, and Bang Krathum to the west. Phai Lom lies in the Nan Basin, which is part of the Chao Phraya Watershed. The Wang Thong River flows through Phai Lom.

Administration
The subdistrict is divided into 11 smaller divisions called (muban), which roughly correspond to the villages in Phai Lom. There are six villages, several of which occupy multiple muban. Phai Lom is administered by a Tambon administrative organization (TAO). The muban in Phai Lom are enumerated as follows:

Temples
Phai Lom is home to the following five temples:
Wat Apai Supraron Pum (Thai:  วัดอภัยสุพรรณภูมิ) in Ban Beung Chang
Wat Tha Na (Ban Tha Na Village Temple) in Ban Tha Na
Wat Tha Makam (Ban Tha Makam Village Temple) in Ban Tha Makam
Wat Beung Chang (Ban Beung Chang Village Temple) in Ban Beung Chang
Wat Phai Lom in Ban Beung Chang

References

Tambon of Phitsanulok province
Populated places in Phitsanulok province